Adolf I of Lotharingia, count of Keldachgau, Vogt of Deutz from 1008 until 1018, was the son of Hermann I "Pusillus" (the Little Pfalzgraf), count palatine of Lotharingia. He left three sons:

Hermann III, Vogt of Deutz in St. Severin (Cologne) und Werden (died 1056);
Adolf II of Lotharingia, count of Keldachgau, Vogt of Deutz (born 1002, died 1041);
Erenfried, Probst of St. Severin.

References

Further reading
Lewald, Ursula, 'Die Ezzonen. Das Schicksal eines rheinischen Fürstengeschlechts', Rheinische Vierteljahrsblätter 43 (1979) S.120-168
Gerstner, Ruth, 'Die Geschichte der lothringischen Pfalzgrafschaft (von den Anfängen bis zur Ausbildung des Kurterritoriums Pfalz)', Rheinisches Archiv 40 (Bonn 1941)
Kimpen, E., ‘Ezzonen und Hezeliniden in der rheinischen Pfalzgrafschaft’, Mitteilungen des Österreichischen Instituts für Geschichtsforschung. XII. Erg.-Band. (Innsbruck 1933) S.1-91.
Steinbach, F., ‘Die Ezzonen. Ein Versuch territorialpolitischen Zusammenschlusses der fränkischen Rheinlande’, Collectanea Franz Steinbach. Aufsätze und Abhandlungen zur Verfassungs-, Sozial- und Wirtschaftsgeschichte, geschichtlichen Landeskunde und Kulturraumforschung, ed. F. Petri en G. Droege (Bonn 1967) S.64-81.

Year of birth unknown
1018 deaths
Counts Palatine of Lotharingia
House of Berg
Counts of Limburg
House of Limburg-Stirum